Copies of the World Radio TV Handbook (including the 1991 edition) have identified 1485 kHz as a local frequency, akin to the Class C (former Class IV) radio stations in North America which are limited to 1kW.

The following radio stations broadcast on AM frequency 1485 kHz:

Italy
Broadcast Italia: Rome (C-QUAM AM stereo)

Netherlands
"Dreamradio AM" at Baexem  (C-QUAM AM stereo)

United Kingdom
BBC Radio 4 at Carlisle, Cumbria

References

Lists of radio stations by frequency